Khakrez, also written Khakriz and Khak Reiz, is a village and the district center of Khakrez District, Kandahar Province, Afghanistan. It (or an adjacent village) is also known as Darvishan. Khakrez is the location of the district center building and the Shah Agha Shrine or Shah Maqsud Shrine, one of the oldest historical Islamic sites in Afghanistan.

References

External links

Populated places in Kandahar Province